Los Umbrellos was a Latin pop dance group formed in Denmark. It was formed by record producer Kenneth Bager in 1997 and disbanded in 1999. It was led by the rapper Al Agami, the exiled crown prince of the small African enclave of Lado. His family fled to Denmark to escape the persecution of Ugandan dictator Idi Amin. The group contained backing vocals from two former models and Danish TV co-hosts, Mai Britt Vingsøe and Grith Höifeldt.

The group released only one album in 1997, entitled Flamenco Funk. Their single, "No Tengo Dinero", went to number 33 on the UK Singles Chart, and peaked at number 42 on the U.S. Billboard Hot 100 that year. The song also hit No. 1 in Austria and the top five in New Zealand, Switzerland and Italy.

Discography

Studio albums

Singles

References

Danish pop music groups
Latin pop music groups
Musical groups established in 1997
Musical groups disestablished in 1999
Musical groups from Copenhagen